The Alexander Nevsky Memorial Church is an historic Russian Orthodox church building in Potsdam, Germany.

Consecrated in 1826, it is still an active congregation and the oldest Russian Orthodox church in Germany. Designed by Vasily Stasov, Nevsky Church is a very early example of the Byzantine Revival architecture in Germany, and one of the earliest examples of Byzantine Revival in Russian Revival architecture.

References

Churches in Potsdam
Potsdam
Russian Orthodox church buildings in Germany
Potsdam AlexanderNevsky
Vasily Stasov buildings and structures
Byzantine Revival architecture in Germany
Russian Revival architecture